Countdown is an Australian-owned New Zealand full-service supermarket chain and subsidiary of Woolworths New Zealand, itself a subsidiary of Australia's Bella Vista’s Woolworths Group. It is one of two supermarket chains in New Zealand in terms of number of stores, although the rival Foodstuffs chain has a larger number of premises including smaller retail stores in rural areas.

There are 184 Countdown stores, with 61 in Auckland.

History

Discount supermarket chain (1981–2008)

In May 1981, the first Countdown market opened at Northlands Shopping Centre in the Christchurch suburb of Papanui by Rattrays Wholesale. The Rattrays Wholesale Group included the Rattrays Cash and Carry warehouses, tobacco vans, now known as the Red Arrow Distributors fleet, and also included the SuperValue group of franchised supermarkets.

In October 1993, Foodland Associated Limited (FAL) bought the majority shareholding in Progressive Enterprises from Coles Myer and, shortly after, bought all remaining public shares and delisted Progressive Enterprises from the New Zealand stock exchange. With this purchase, Progressive Enterprises became the parent company for a number of FAL brands. Progressive Enterprises consisted of Foodtown Supermarkets, Countdown, Georgie Pie, Rattrays and Supervalue.

In 2006, Foodland Associated Limited (FAL) Australia, purchased the Countdown/Rattrays business. This acquisition was then followed by gaining a majority shareholding in Progressive Enterprises Limited, including General Distributors Limited, trading as Foodtown.

On 17 June 2002, Progressive Enterprises bought Woolworths (NZ) Ltd from Hong Kong-based owners Dairy Farm Group. The sale saw Progressive Enterprises's supermarket brands Foodtown, Countdown, 3 Guys, SuperValue and FreshChoice joined by Woolworths, Big Fresh and Price Chopper. As a result, Progressive Enterprises increased its share of the New Zealand grocery market to approximately 45%.

In 2003 Progressive Enterprises closed its Auckland and Christchurch distribution centres and rehired the redundant workers.

During the period of 1993–2005, Countdown changed from a foodmarket type format offering mainly groceries to a "full-service discount supermarket". The stores vary in size due to the consolidation of brands after the merger with Woolworths (NZ) Ltd. A number of Big Fresh, Price Chopper, and 3 Guys stores were rebranded to Countdown stores during after this merger.

On 24 November 2005, Australian company Woolworths Limited purchased Progressive Enterprises from Foodland Associated Limited.

In October 2006, Progressive Enterprises announced a discount fuel scheme with Gull Petroleum and Shell to offer discounts on petrol when shoppers spend $40 or more in their Woolworths, Foodtown or Countdown stores. This scheme was similar to the one their parent company Woolworths Limited offered in Australia.  The Australian Competition & Consumer Commission investigated whether this activity was anticompetitive, the result of which was an undertaking by the parent company to change its methods of offering fuel discounts in Australia.  Foodstuffs stores in New Zealand also offered fuel discounts at BP and their own New World and Pak'nSave fuel sites.

In July 2008, Onecard, which could previously only be used at Woolworths and Foodtown, was extended to Countdown.

In October 2008, Countdown had 13 stores.

National supermarket chain (2008–present)

In September 2009, Progressive Enterprises announced it would re-brand all its Foodtown and Woolworths stores to Countdown as stores were refurbished. The final Foodtown and Woolworths locations to be re-branded were Browns Bay and Meadowlands respectively, both on 14 November 2011. A single Woolworths outlet continued to operate at Mount Maunganui's Bayfair Shopping Centre up until late 2018. The store was not rebranded because a Countdown already existed at the centre. The store has now been closed due to the centre expanding. Both stores stock a similar range of products. A similar situation occurs in Highland Park, Auckland where a former Foodtown was rebranded to a Countdown alongside a newer Countdown in the same shopping centre and in Napier, where two Countdown stores are located directly across the road from each other.

In terms of branding, the Countdown stores existing before the initial rebranding generally retain the old style logo (although some have been updated) but the rebranded Woolworth/Foodtown stores have been updated to display the new style logo.

In February 2012, Countdown had 84 stores.

On 10 December 2012, Countdown launched its first Countdown branded in-store pharmacy. On 3 November 2014, Countdown began selling low-cost travel and life insurance through a deal with insurance giant Cigna.

On 1 August 2016, Countdown began its partnership with BP and Caltex through the AA Smartfuel program to offer fuel discounts, replacing its partnership with Z. The partnership with Gull continued until October 2016.

In 2019, a quiet-hour was introduced to the supermarkets for customers who had ear or eye sensitivities.

During the national lockdowns in response to COVID-19 pandemic in New Zealand, Countdown limited the number of customers allowed inside stores at any one time.

On 10 May 2021, a stabbing attack occurred at the Countdown supermarket in central Dunedin, leaving four injured.

On 3 September 2021, another stabbing attack occurred at the LynnMall Countdown in New Lynn, injuring at least six. The attacker was shot and killed by police.

Operations

As of September 2018 there are a total of 180 Countdown supermarkets operating throughout the North and South Islands of New Zealand.

Major store operations are handled in Woolworths NZ's head office in Mangere, Auckland. The stores are divided in between 10 areas. Each area has an Area Manager (or Group Manager as they are sometimes called), and all areas are supported by a National Operations Manager. Previously, the areas were split into North and South regions, with 5 areas each.

Pricing and specials are divided into two regions: North Island and South Island. Internally, the North Island region is further subdivided into two sub-divisions: Upper and Lower.

Countdown also provides New Zealand wide online grocery delivery (excluding Waiheke Island) services through its online grocery shop.

"New Generation" Countdowns - those that have been built or refurbished since mid-2008 - have 30% of their retail floor space dedicated to fresh foods, a wider range of products than older Countdown stores (up to 30,000 items), and heating and refrigeration systems that are more energy-efficient and sustainable than older Countdown stores.

Logistics 
All grocery items and general merchandise is supplied to stores through one of four distribution centres: at the head office in Auckland (National DC), one in Wiri (Upper North Island DC), in Palmerston North (Lower North Island), and in Christchurch (South Island). Deliveries are made daily to stores.

Chilled and frozen goods are supplied to stores by third party logistics operator Versacold. They operate three distribution centers in Auckland, Palmerston North and Christchurch, and deliver to stores daily.

Produce is supplied to stores by third party Freshmax. Fruit and vegetables from across New Zealand and the world are sent to the three distribution centers in Auckland, Wellington, and Christchurch, where they are shipped to stores daily. However, only certain stores receive a Sunday delivery.

In recent years, Countdown has moved away from having on-site butcheries and have moved to centralized facilities. Cabinet Ready Meat (CRM: pre-cut and pre-packed meat) is supplied to non-butchery stores from a central plant in Auckland. Due to the complications of logistics in shipping CRM to the South Island, all South Island Countdowns have retained their butcheries.

Competition 
Countdown's main competitors are both owned by co-operative Foodstuffs - the other player in the New Zealand supermarket duopoly - in the form of full-service supermarket chain New World (with 140 stores across NZ) and lower-cost 'food warehouse' Pak'nSave (57 supermarkets mainly concentrated in larger urban areas).

In terms of pricing, Countdown generally places on par with New World and above Pak n Save. In a September 2009 Consumer magazine survey, Countdown was placed third in Auckland, with a basket of 40 brand-name items costing $136, four dollars higher than New World and $21 higher than Pak'n Save.
A year earlier in September 2008, a Consumer magazine survey placed Countdown second in Auckland, with a basket of 15 private label items costing $38.24, $0.91 higher than fellow Progressive Enterprises's brand Woolworths (the Woolworths stores in question have since been rebrand as Countdown), and $1.87 lower than third-place Pak'n Save.

Marketing and branding

New Countdown branding was introduced on 21 September 2009. The word "Countdown" reused the original logo's red colour, but with a newly adapted font-type. The previous light green background was replaced with a white one and a logo with the "Shop Smarter" slogan was added. The logo - representing fresh produce - is also used by Australian Woolworths outlets. As of 2018, the font used in the logo was changed to one more similar to the Australian Woolworths, and itself is dark green, but when used on stores it is white.

On stores, the slogan is missing and the word "Countdown" is white. The logo and name sit on a dark grey background. On newer Countdowns, however (those built after 2013) the logo and name sit on a dark green background. Some older stores still have the old branding, which is the lettering 'Countdown' in red or orange on either a light or dark green background.

"Shop Smarter" - Countdown's current slogan was introduced in mid-2009 to the Countdown, Woolworths and Foodtown brands. The new slogan also accompanied the introduction of "The Smart Shopper", a series of 60-second twice-weekly television segment hosted by Richard Till.

Countdown Kids Hospital Appeal 
From August to November every year, every Countdown store conducts fundraisers for sick children, using techniques including selling $2 wristbands and $5 raffle tickets.

Food donations 
In 2011 Countdown put a formal structure in place, partnering with the Salvation Army to launch Countdown Food Rescue. This nationwide program ensures that food that can't be sold but is still fit for consumption is put to good use. They also donate a large trolley full of food from each of their 180 stores every year at Christmas.

Loyalty schemes 
Countdown has two major loyalty schemes called Onecard and Onecard Visa

Onecard
Countdown uses a discount and rewards programme called "OneCard" which was introduced in July 2003 and was shared by the Woolworths and Foodtown brands. The actual Onecard is a standard magnetic stripe card that is loaded into the POS system via the EFTPOS terminal. Countdown's Onecard specials are the predominantly visible price on member-discounted products. The non-promotional price is displayed below.

Onecard Visa
Onecard Visa is a Visa card based on Onecard. It is the same as the regular Visa cards and has additional rewards features.

Fuel discounts
Introduced in 2006, Countdown supermarkets began offering fuel discounts for transactions of $40 and over (as of September 2009). In August 2016 fuel discounts redeemable at BP, Caltex and Gull petrol stations replaced the former arrangement with Shell/Z.

Private label brands 

Countdown has seven private label brands - of which all except Signature Range and 'Countdown' branded products are in common with private label brands of Woolworths Supermarkets Australia.

 Countdown Own Brand - A range of products; which are also claimed to be healthier than fully branded products
 Woolworths Freefrom / Free From Gluten - grocery items for specific dietary requirements
 Macro / Macro Free Range / Macro Organic - grocery products from organic and free range sources)
 Woolworths Essentials - Low-cost and 'essential' items 
The Odd Bunch - A range of fresh produce at a lower price; due to irregularities in shape or size. 
Platitude - A range of plant-based options, such as plant-based meat substitutes 
Countdown Gold - a range of limited edition premium products; often Christmas exclusives 

In 2016 Countdown began the process of merging their Homebrand, Select and Signature Range brands to their Woolworths Essentials and Countdown Value / Everyday / Finest Brand. The Homebrand brand will be converted to Essentials and the Select and Signature range to the Countdown brand over the course of 2016, 2017 and 2018. This re-branding is expected to be completed by 2018. Countdown will still retain the Free From, Macro and Gold Brands

Store electrical faults causing the first “O” to go missing 
In March 2018, users on social media and online news (e.g. Newshub) reported an electrical fault on the “Countdown” signage causing the first “O” to go missing at Auckland Airport Countdown. It was also believed that Countdown Invercargill and Northcote expected the same issue the year before. Countdown responded, and resolved the issue.

See also

 Woolworths (New Zealand supermarket chain)
 Woolworths Supermarkets (Australia)
 Albert Gubay

References

External links

 

Supermarkets of New Zealand
Retail companies established in 1981
Woolworths Group (Australia)
1981 establishments in New Zealand